Joaquín Álvarez Álvarez (born 4 July 1980), known as Quini, is a Spanish former professional footballer who played as a striker.

He began his professional career at age 30, and appeared in 120 Segunda División matches over four seasons, scoring a total of 38 goals for Alcorcón and Racing de Santander.

Career
From 1997 to 2010, Madrid-born Quini competed exclusively in the lower leagues of Spanish football, representing nine clubs including CA Pinto (two spells). In the 2009–10 season he scored 20 goals in 35 matches for CD Leganés, also in the Community of Madrid.

At the age of already 30, Quini made his Segunda División debut, with AD Alcorcón with whom he had already played six years before. He finished the 2010–11 campaign with 22 goals, fifth-best in the competition as the team easily retained their newly acquired status; highlights included a hat-trick against Girona FC (3–1 home win) and braces against SD Ponferradina (2–0, home), Xerez CD (3–1, home), Córdoba CF (2–1 at home), UD Las Palmas (5–0, home) and CD Tenerife (3–2 home victory).

Quini lowered his totals to 13 in 2011–12, but the side again stayed in the second tier, finishing in fourth position and qualifying to the playoffs. He was loaned to Racing de Santander in January 2013, and suffered relegation with the latter.

Quini left Alcorcón in the summer of 2014, and moved to CD Eldense in the Segunda División B. He retired in January 2015, immediately becoming the latter club's director of football.

References

External links

1980 births
Living people
Footballers from Madrid
Spanish footballers
Association football forwards
Segunda División players
Segunda División B players
Tercera División players
Divisiones Regionales de Fútbol players
CD Leganés B players
RSD Alcalá players
AD Alcorcón footballers
Zamora CF footballers
CD Leganés players
Racing de Santander players
CD Eldense footballers